Love Story is an album by the English musician Lloyd Cole, released in 1995. Cole supported the album with UK and North American tours.

The album peaked at No. 27 on the UK Albums Chart. The first single was "Like Lovers Do". "Sentimental Fool" was also released.

Production
Recorded in New York City, the album was produced by Cole and Stephen Street, among others. Cole considered the album to be an example of what he does best, rather than another attempt to reinvent himself. Robert Quine and Neil Clark played guitar on the album. Fred Maher played drums. "Trigger Happy" is about getting older.

Critical reception

Trouser Press noted that "there's certainly nothing lacking in the spare, well-crafted songwriting or Cole's frequently beauteous (and ever-breaking) shaggy-dog voice." The Guardian opined that the album "passes in a comfy blur, only the melancholy 'Baby' making much impression." The Chicago Tribune determined that "the record's stripped-down arrangements, built around Cole's acoustic guitar, focus attention on how economical his songwriting has become over the years."

The Irish Times concluded that Cole "seems to have regained the immediacy and simplicity which made him an icon of the bedsit set, and which put him right up there with Morrissey in the hearts of many thinking teens." The Calgary Herald deemed Cole "a British Leonard Cohen in soft-soled shoes." The Ottawa Citizen stated that "'Sentimental Fool', 'Love Ruins Everything' and 'Trigger Happy' are infectious, timeless pop with a hint of irony."

AllMusic called the album "melodic folk-rock" that presents a "negative world-view."

Track listing

References

Lloyd Cole albums
1995 albums
Fontana Records albums
Rykodisc albums